The 2016 Virginia Tech Hokies football team represented Virginia Tech in the 2016 NCAA Division I FBS football season. The Hokies were led by first-year head coach, Justin Fuente and played their home games at Lane Stadium in Blacksburg, Virginia. Since 2004, Virginia Tech has played in the Atlantic Coast Conference and is currently in its Coastal Division.

The Hokies finished the 2016 season with a regular season record of 9–3, winning its sixth ACC Coastal Division title. The Hokies played Clemson in the ACC Championship Game; Clemson won the game, 42–35.

Virginia Tech played Arkansas in the Belk Bowl on December 29, 2016. Arkansas took a 24–0 lead into halftime. However, in the second half, several Arkansas turnovers along with defensive adjustments, allowed Virginia Tech to score 35 unanswered points and win, 35–24. The comeback was the greatest in the team's 124-year history.

The Hokies finished the season with a record of 10–4, and ranked #16 in both the AP Poll and the Coaches Poll.

Personnel

Coaching staff

Schedule

Schedule Source:

‡ – Current NCAA record for largest attendance for a collegiate football game.

Game summaries

Liberty

vs. Tennessee

Boston College

East Carolina

North Carolina

at Syracuse

Miami (FL)

at Pittsburgh

at Duke

Georgia Tech

at Notre Dame

Virginia

vs. Clemson–ACC Championship Game

vs. Arkansas–Belk Bowl

Honorary #25 Beamer Jersey 
At the start of the 2016 season, Head Coach Justin Fuente began a tradition of selecting an outstanding special teams player to wear the #25 jersey in honor of former head coach, Frank Beamer, who wore #25 as a player for Virginia Tech.

The players honored in the 2016 season are:

Rankings

References

External links

Virginia Tech
Virginia Tech Hokies football seasons
Duke's Mayo Bowl champion seasons
Virginia Tech Hokies football